Gray frog may refer to:

 Cope's gray tree frog (Hyla chrysoscelis), a frog in the family Hylidae found in the United States
 Gray balloon frog (Uperodon globulosus), a frog in the family Microhylidae found in India, Nepal, and Bangladesh
 Gray foam-nest tree frog (Chiromantis xerampelina), a frog in the family Rhacophoridae, found in Sub-Saharan Africa
 Gray tree frog (Hyla versicolor), a frog in the family Hylidae native to much of the eastern United States and southeastern Canada
 Merlin's dwarf gray frog (Pseudhymenochirus merlini), a frog in the family Pipidae found in Guinea, Guinea-Bissau, and Sierra Leone

Animal common name disambiguation pages